Raga Kedar, also known as Kedara, is a Hindustani classical raga. Named after Lord Shiva, the raga occupies a high pedestal in Indian classical music. It is characterised by many melodious turns. This raga is the repetition of the swaras सा and म. It is generally accepted that it displays much thermal energy and is regarded as the Raagini of Raag Deepak. While preceding from Shuddha Madhyam (m) to Pancham (P), a touch of Gandhar (G) or a smooth passage from Gandhar (G) to Pancham (P) expressed as m G P is the more common way of instant raga manifestation.

Origin 
The raga emerges from the Kalyan thaat. This raga is named after Lord Shiva and is loved by Lord Krishna. Lord Krishna played this raga on his flute and everyone in Gokul was mesmerized.

Technical description 
The raga is of shaadava-sampurna nature, i.e., in its arohana (ascent), only six notes are used, and in avarohana (descent), all seven notes are used. In general, the progression of the raga is highly non-linear, which makes it difficult to capture its essence using arohana and avarohana.

The raga uses only natural (shuddha) versions of the Second (R), Third (G) and Sixth (D), both natural and sharp versions of the Fourth (m and M, respectively  "( m- , M- )" and predominantly natural versions of the Seventh (N) but occasionally also its flat version (n).

Arohana: S M, M'P D M , D N S`

Avarohana: S' N D P, m P D P M~ , S R S

Pakad: S M, M P, m P m P, D P M, R S

The notes of the raga are s r g m (m is ) p d n s.

The most prominent (vadi) note is m, and the second most prominent (samvadi) is S.

Samay 
The raga is to be sung at night. It is sung in the first prahar of night. Most ragas with  ma (M) are sung at night (as per the time theory of ragas).

Further information 
The meend from D to M via P is the heart of the raga. This phrase is repeated again and again. The G is used as a grace note in the transition from m to P. The movements in the raga from one  to another are complicated, and the extent of use of the different  often depends on the singer. Kedar is one of five ragas that form the Kalyan Panchak or Panchya with Hameer, Gaud Sarang, Kamod, Chhayanat and Kedar. Kedar is an ancient raga, with different genres of classical songs, like khayals, thumris, dhrupads, as well as light classical songs based on it.

According to the Guru Granth Sahib, raga Kedara (ਕੇਦਾਰਾ) expresses and makes the mind aware of the soul's true character. It conveys the emotions of honesty, integrity and truthfulness in a practical and caring way. This approach is memorable, so that the mind is made aware, without arousing cynicism.

Variants 
 Adambari Kedar
 Anandi Kedar
 Basanti Kedar
 Chandni Kedar
 Deepak Kedar
 Jaladhar Kedar
 Kedar Bahar
 Kedari Malhar
 Maluha Kedar
 Nat Kedar
 Shuddha Kedar
 Shyam Kedar
 Tilak Kedar

Film songs

Tamil

Hindi 
Following are the films that used material from raga Kedar:
  - Mughal-e-Azam (1960)- Lata Mangeshkar
  - Sawan Ko Aane Do (1979)- Yesudas
  (1957) – Hemant Kumar, Manna Dey, Sudha Malhotra, Chorus
  - Guddi (1971) – Vani Jairam

References

Sources

External links 
 Raga Kedar – A Perspective
 SRA on Samay and Ragas
 
 
 

Kedar